Rome was in disorder due to the ongoing conflict between the Colonna and the Orsini. As soon as Holy Week was over, to escape the violence, Benedict XI withdrew to Perugia, where he died that summer, probably of dysentery. The protracted papal conclave held from 10 or 17 July 1304 to 5 June 1305 in Perugia elected non-cardinal Raymond Bertrand de Got as Pope Clement V. At the time of his election de Got was Archbishop of Bordeaux, and thus a subject of Edward I, King of England (who had recently conquered Normandy), although he was a childhood friend of Philip IV of France ("the Fair"). Clement V's decision to relocate the papacy to France was one of the most contested issues in the papal conclave, 1314–1316 following his death, during which the minority of Italian cardinals were unable to engineer the return of the papacy to Rome. This immediately preceded the beginning of the Avignon Papacy.

Cardinal electors
Rome was in disorder due to the ongoing conflict between the Colonna and the Orsini. As soon as Holy Week was over, to escape the violence, Benedict XI withdrew to Perugia, where he died that summer, probably of dysentery. As the Curia had accompanied the Pope, the conclave was held in the city where he died.

Of the 19 living cardinals, only 15 were present in the conclave. Exactly 10 of these, constituting the minimum two-thirds necessary, voted for Bertrand de Got, who became Clement V. Two other cardinals, Giacomo and Pietro Colonna (uncle and nephew), had been deposed by Pope Boniface VIII and were thus ineligible to participate in the election; their cardinalates were subsequently restored by Clement V.

Absentee cardinals
All four cardinals left early as a result of illness.

Politics

The Sacred College of Cardinals was divided into two factions: pro-French and anti-French ("Bonifacians"). The smaller, pro-French party counted six cardinals under the leadership of cardinals Napoleone Orsini Frangipani and Niccolò Alberti. They looked for the reconciliation with France and Colonna. The larger party, anti-French, led by Cardinal Matteo Orsini Rosso and Francesco Caetani, cardinal-nephew of Boniface VIII, demanded atonement for the outrage committed on the person of Boniface VIII by French Chancellor Nogaret at Anagni, and rejected any concessions towards Philip IV of France. It counted 10 electors. At the beginning of the conclave the cardinals arbitrarily decided to annul the most restrictive rules of the Constitution Ubi periculum about the conclave, which made it possible to prolong the proceedings. During the first months of the conclave both parties voted mainly for their leaders: Matteo Orsini and Napoleone Orsini. But old Matteo Orsini (aged 74) fell ill and couldn't take an active part in the conclave. Lack of effective leadership eventually led to division in the anti-French party. Some of its members, looking for a compromise, proposed archbishop Bertrand de Got of Bordeaux. Napoleone Orsini initially was sceptical about this candidature but finally he had accepted it. His opinion was decisive for the result, because an alliance of pro-French party with the "Bonifacian dissidents" gave exactly the required majority of two thirds. On June 5, 1305, after 11 months of deliberations, Bertrand de Got was elected to the Papacy.

At the time of his election de Got was Archbishop of Bordeaux, and thus a subject of Edward I, King of England (who had recently conquered Normandy), although he was a childhood friend of Philip IV of France ("the Fair").

Sources
One eyewitness to the conclave was Florentine historian Giovanni Villani (Hist. Florent., VIII, 80, in Muratori, Rerum Italicarum Scriptores, XIII, 417; cf. Raynaldus, Caesaris Baronii Annales Ecclesiastici, 1305, 2-4).

Aftermath

The cardinals besought de Got upon his election to join them in Perugia and thereafter to travel to Rome for his papal coronation; however, he ordered them to travel to Lyon for his coronation on November 4, 1305, at which Philip IV of France ("the Fair") was present. During the ensuing public procession a collapsing wall knocked Clement V from his horse (resulting in the loss of a carbuncle from the Papal Tiara) and killed both the brother of Clement V and the aged Matteo Orsini Rosso (a participant in twelve conclaves). The next day, another brother of Clement V was killed in a dispute between his servants and the retainers of the College of Cardinals.

Philip IV immediately demanded of Clement V that the memory of Pope Boniface VIII be condemned, that his name be stricken from the list of popes, that his bones be disinterred and burned, that his ashes be scattered to the wind, and that he be declared a heretic, blasphemer, and immoral priest. Clement V delayed such an action without explicitly refusing it and in the meantime made several important concessions to Philip IV: he extended the absolution granted by Benedict XI, created nine French cardinals (a mix of crown-cardinals and cardinal-nephews), restored the cardinalates of Giacomo and Pietro Colonna (which had been deprived by Boniface VIII), gave Philip IV a five-year title to a variety of church property, withdrew the papal bull Clericis laicos (1296) and limited the bull Unam sanctam (1302, both of Boniface VIII), granted some church revenues to Charles of Valois, pretender to the Byzantine throne, and made concessions weakening the Knights Templar. However, Philip IV wanted to a see a process similar to the Cadaver Synod initiated against Boniface VIII, which Clement V seemingly yielded to, setting a date of February 2, 1309; however, as this process proved to be dilatory and likely favorable to the deceased pontiff, Philip IV moved to cancel it in February 1311; by the time the Council of Vienne (which ultimately sided with Boniface VIII) had been called, Philip IV demanded only that he be absolved of responsibility for the various processes against Boniface VIII, which he was.

Between 1305 and 1309, Clement V moved from Bordeaux to Poitiers to Toulouse before taking up residence as a guest in the Dominican monastery of Avignon (at the time, a fief of Naples, and part of the Comtat Venaissin, a territory directly subject to the Holy See since 1228). Clement V's decision to relocate the papacy to France was one of the most contested issues in the papal conclave, 1314–1316 following his death, during which the minority of Italian cardinals were unable to engineer the return of the papacy to Rome. Avignon remained a territory of Naples until Pope Clement VI purchased it from Joan I of Naples for 80,000 gold gulden in 1348.

Notes

Bibliography

G. Mollat. 1963. The Popes at Avignon 1305-1378. London.
 K. Dopierała. 1996. Księga papieży. Pallotinum, Poznań. 
 A. Piazzoni. 2003. Historia wyboru papieży. Wyd. M, Kraków

14th-century elections
1304
1305
Avignon Papacy
Papal conclaves
14th-century Catholicism
14th century in Europe
1304 in Europe
1305 in Europe